Sanne Vermeer (born 25 March 1998) is a Dutch judoka. She is a bronze medalist in the women's 63 kg event at the 2021 World Judo Championships and the 2021 European Judo Championships. In 2019, she also won one of the bronze medals in her event at the European Games held in Minsk, Belarus.

Career

She won the gold medal in the women's 63 kg event at the 2015 World Judo Cadets Championships held in Sarajevo, Bosnia and Herzegovina. She also won the gold medal in her event at the 2016 European Junior Judo Championships held in Málaga, Spain and the 2017 European Junior Judo Championships held in Maribor, Slovenia. At the 2017 World Judo Juniors Championships in Zagreb, Croatia, she won the silver medal in her event.

She competed in the women's 63 kg and women's team events at the 2017 European Judo Championships held in Warsaw, Poland. In the same year, she won one of the bronze medals in the women's 63 kg event at the Judo Grand Prix The Hague held in The Hague, Netherlands.

In 2018, she won the gold medal in her event at the World Judo Juniors Championships held in Nassau, The Bahamas. A few days later, she was eliminated in her second match in the women's 63 kg event at the World Judo Championships held in Baku, Azerbaijan. A year later, she lost her bronze medal match in the women's 63 kg event at the 2019 World Judo Championships held in Tokyo, Japan.

In January 2021, she won one of the bronze medals in her event at the Judo World Masters held in Doha, Qatar. A few months later, she won one of the bronze medals in the women's 63 kg event at the 2021 European Judo Championships held in Lisbon, Portugal. She was not selected as one of the judoka to represent the Netherlands at the 2020 Summer Olympics in Tokyo, Japan which turned her year's focus to the 2021 World Judo Championships in Budapest, Hungary. She reached the semi-finals in the women's 63 kg event where she lost against the eventual gold medalist Clarisse Agbegnenou of France. Vermeer then secured the bronze medal by defeating Ketleyn Quadros of Brazil. At the 2021 Judo Grand Slam Abu Dhabi held in Abu Dhabi, United Arab Emirates, she won the silver medal in her event.

She won one of the bronze medals in her event at the 2022 Judo Grand Slam Paris held in Paris, France.

References

External links
 
 

1998 births
Living people
Sportspeople from Leeuwarden
Dutch female judoka
European Games medalists in judo
European Games bronze medalists for the Netherlands
Judoka at the 2019 European Games
21st-century Dutch women